Zaporizhstal is Ukraine's fourth-largest steel maker with an annual capacity of 4.5 million tonnes of steel, 3.3 million tonnes of pig iron, and 4.1 million of finished steel products, and ranks 54th in the world. The company is Ukraine's only manufacturer of cold-rolled sheets, used in car manufacturing, as well as tinplates and polished stainless and alloyed steel. Zaporizhstal is located in the city of Zaporizhzhia, in a region with the highest per capita electricity output in Ukraine, close to raw material suppliers and steel consumers (pipe and machine building companies). The company was founded in 1933.

Ownership

After the collapse of the USSR and the independence of Ukraine, the mill fell into the hands of the Ukrainian government. When privatization began in the mid-1990s, Vasily Khmelnytsky, an ambitious politician-turned-businessman, was named manager of the state's stake in the plant, and subsequently engineered the insider sale of many shares of the plant to his own investment company.

The Ukrainian government began offering shares in Zaporizhstal in cash auctions in 1999. By 2001, Vasyl Khmelnytsky and a consortium led by the Midland Group controlled 93% of the mill. According to court documents, the Midland Group sold its 50% stake in 2009 to then-independent investment bank Troika Dialog following a bidding war that included other Zaporizhstal shareholders. However, The Wall Street Journal reports that the mill was sold in an offshore transaction that included five separate companies and was financed by Russian state-owned Vnesheconombank. It's unclear how this reporting relates to the UK court record of the sale to Troika.

A Ukrainian holding company, Metinvest, eventually became full owners of the mill in 2013.

Production
In 2003, the company produced 4,355 ths. tonnes of raw steel (market share of 12%) and 3,625 ths. tonnes of finished steel products (11% share). Exports, delivered to 59 countries, accounted for 70% of Zaporizhstal's 2003 sales, with China, Middle Eastern states and the CIS among the main destinations. In 2015, the company has made 3.81 million tonnes of cast iron, 3.98 million tonnes of steel, 3.35 million tonnes of rolled steel.

Zaporizhstal is considered to be one of the largest polluting companies in Ukraine.

Directors
 1934—1937 — Isak Rohachevskyi
 1937—1948 — Anatoliy Kuzmin
 1948—1956 — Anastas Boborykin
 1956—1982 — Lev Yupko
 1982—1986 — Oleksandr Herasymenko
 1986—2012 — Vitaliy Satskyi
 2012—2019 — Rostyslav Shurma
 from 2019 — Oleksandr Myronenko

Awards
Order of Lenin
Order of the October Revolution

See also
Zaporizhzhia Foundry and Mechanical Plant

References

External links
 

 
Steel companies of Ukraine
Steel companies of the Ukrainian Soviet Socialist Republic
Companies based in Zaporizhzhia
Ukrainian brands
SCM Holdings